Statistics of Úrvalsdeild in the 1934 season.

Overview
It was contested by 5 teams, and KR won the championship.

League standings

Results

References

Úrvalsdeild karla (football) seasons
Iceland
Iceland
Urvalsdeild